A list of notable lesbian magazines, periodicals, newsletters, and journals.

Africa

South Africa
 Closet Magazine – c. 1998–?
 Legacy – Lesbian Arts Magazine – Johannesburg, 1990
 The Quarterly
 Sunday's Women – 1990s?
 Umzabalazo – official newsletter of the Coalition of African Lesbians, a continent-wide organization of lesbians in Africa – Johannesburg, 2007–present
 Womyn – 2000–2003

Asia and the Middle East

China
 Les+ – Beijing, longest running lesbian magazine in China, 2005–2012

Indonesia
 Goya Lestari – published by group Chandra Kirana, 1993–?

Israel
 Klaf Hazak – lesbian feminist quarterly from KLaF/CLAF (Kehila Lesbit Feministit/Community of Lesbian Feminists), c.1990–?

Japan
1970 to 1980
Feminist Forum: Feminism in Japan and the World (Tokyo, Japan, 1979–1985)
 
 Hikariguruma – 1978
 Subarashii Onnatachi – Tokyo, lesbian feminist magazine of Wakakusa no Kai – , 1976
  Za Daiku (ザ・ダイク) – 1978

1980 to 1990
 Eve & Eve (イブ＆イブ) –
 Regumi Tsūshin (れ組通信) – Tokyo, (also known as RST, Regumi Studio Tokyo), 1985–present

1990 to present
 Aniisu (アニース) – (1996–1997, 2001–2003)
 Furiine (Phryné; フリーネ) 1995 (two issues total)
 Kaamira (Carmilla; カーミラ) – (2002–2005)
 Labrys (ラブリス) – continued by LOUD News, 1992–1995?
 LOUD News – published by "Lesbians of Undeniable Drive", 1995–2011?
 Misuto (ミスト／美粋) – Josei ladies comics magazine, 1996–1999

Unknown date
 Lesbian News & Views (English language journal from Japan)

Korea
 Kkiri-kkiri – Seoul, newsletter of Kkiri-kkiri, now the Lesbian Counseling Center

Lebanon
 Bekhsoos – magazine of Meem

Palestine
 Aswat Newsletter – Haifa, published by Aswat Gay Palestinian Women

Philippines
My Femme (2009–?)

Taiwan
 Ai Fu Hao Zi Zai Bao (abbrev. "Ai-Bao") – Taiwan, 1993–?
 Isle Margin – Taiwan
 Lez's Meeting
 Nu pengyou – Taiwan, published by group Wo Men Zhi Jian, 1994–1998?
 Wo Men Zhi Jian Newsletter – Taiwan, 1991–1994

Thailand
 Anjareesan/Asian Lesbian Network Newsletter – Bangkok, published by Anjaree, 1991–?

Europe

Austria
1970 to 1980
 Lesben-Frauen-Nachrichten – Vienna, 1979–?

1990 to present
 Female Sequences – frauen lesben kulturHEFTig, Vienna, 1999–?
 Frauenlesben rapidité – Vienna, c. 1997
 Lebenszeichen – Vienna, 2001–?
 LILA Schriften – Vienna, 1995–2001
 Osterreichischer Lesbenrundbrief – Vienna, newsletter of HOSI-Lesben

Belgium
 – Brussels, newsletter of Groupe de Recherche et d'Information Feministes (GRIF), c. 1975–78

Croatia
 Just a Girl – Zagreb

Czech Republic
 Alia – magazine of Klub Lambda
 Promluv – magazine of Promluv group

Finland
 ILIS Newsletter – Helsinki, International Lesbian Information Service, 1981–1983
 Pärrä – Helsinki, publication of Akanat Lesbian Group, 1982
 Torajyvä – Helsinki, publication of Akanat Lesbian Group, 1983–1988

France
1970 to 1980
 Quand les Femmes s'aiment – 1978–1980

1980 to 1990
 Bulletin des Archives Lesbiennes (Archives et recherches lesbiennes) – Paris, 1990
 Espaces : bulletin de liaison et d'informations entre lesbiennes radicales – Paris, 1982
 Lesbia: Revue lesbienne d'expression, d'information, d'opinion – Paris, 1982–present
 Vlasta: fictions/utopies amazoniennes, Paris, by the Collectif Mémoires/Utopies, 1983–1985

1990 to present
 LesBienNées – Nancy
 – Lille, 2003–2013

Unknown date
 Espace Lesbien – Toulouse and the Midi-Pyrénées region, newsletter of Bagdam Espace Lesbien
 Les Lesbianaires: revue de presse
 Lesbrouffe: Voies d'Elles – Grenoble, newsletter of the Association des Lesbiennes de Grenoble
 Penthésilée – Association des Femmes Homosexuelles Européennes (AFHE)

Germany
1920 to 1970
Die BIF – Blätter Idealer Frauenfreundschaften, world's first all-female lesbian magazine (1926?–1927)
 Die Freundin, closely affiliated with the League for Human Rights, 1924–1933
 Frauen, Liebe und Leben (1938)
 Frauenliebe (1926–1930)
 Garçonne (1930–1932)
 Ledige Frauen (1928–1929)
 (1951–1952)

1970 to 1980
 Frauen Zeitung – Frauenzentrum – Hamburg, feminist and lesbian newsletter 1976–?
 – Berlin, published by the Lesbenpressenkollektiv de LAZ, 1975–1982
 Protokolle – Münster, Verlag Frauenpolitik, 1976–1979,
 UKZ: Unsere kleine Zeitung – Berlin/Mannheim, 1975–2001

1980 to 1990
 Infoblatt des Lesbenring – Köln, c. 1984–1996?
 LESBENINFO NETZ – Ulm, 1989–?
 Die Lesbischschwule Presseschau – Berlin, 1982–?
 Tarantel – Bielefeld, Tarantel Kollektiv, 1980–?

1990 to present
 Blattgold – West Berlin, c. 1990s
 EMMA – Germany
 Frau Anders – Weimar, 1990–?
 – , Bochum, radical feminist lesbian magazine, 1990–2004
 Krampfader – Kassel, 1986–?
 L-Mag
 Lesben in NRW – Düsseldorf, c. 2005
 Lesbenstich – Dortmund
 Lescriba: Das lesbische Literaturmagazin – Sinzing, 2004–?
 – 1995–2006
 nur sie: Lesben/Frauen-Kulturmagazin für Nürnberg/Fürth/Erlangen – Nürnberg, 1999–?

Unknown year
 Bulletin des Archives Lesbiennes

Greece
 Labrys – Athens, 1980–?
 Lettres Eoliennes: Revue Bimensuelle d'Art Lesbien – Athens, c. 1980s

Hungary
 Dyke Magazin – 2007
 Labrisz Lesbian Newsletter – published by the Labrisz Lesbian Association, c. 1990s,

Ireland
 Gaelick – online lesbian periodical
 LINC: Lesbians in Cork – Cork, c. 2001

Italy
 Bollettino cel C.L.I. – Rome, paper of Centro Feminista Separatista, c. 1981–1991
 Towanda: appunti, spunti e spuntini lesbici – Milan, 1994

Lithuania
 SAPPHO – Vilnius, quarterly magazine of lesbian organization Sappho

Netherlands
1970 to 1980
 Amarant – 1972–present
 Paarse September. Alternatieve Vrouwenkrant – 1972–1974
1980 to 1990
 Diva – 1982–1986, switched to Zij aan Zij in the mid-1990s
 ILIS newsletter – Amsterdam, International Lesbian Information Service, 1980–81, 1987–1998
 Lesbisch Archivaria – Lesbisch Archief Leeuwarden, 1982–?
 Lust en gratie: lesbisch cultureel tijdschrift – Amsterdam, c. 1983–1987
 Nieuwsbrief – Amsterdam, Lesbisch Archief Amsterdam, 1983–1994

1990 to 2000 
 Wild Side Magazine – Amsterdam, Leiden
1990 to present
 Girls Like Us – Amsterdam, 2005–present
 Zij aan Zij – Rijswijk, 1998–present

Poland
 Sigma – Silesia, published one issue only, 1992
 Violet Pulse – Gdańsk

Portugal
1980 to 1990
 Artemísia – Porto, feminist magazine supportive of lesbians, 1985

1990 to present
 Lesbiana – published by Grupo de mulheres da associação ILGA-Portugal, 1999
 LILÁS – Lisbon, 1993
 Organa – Lisbon, first lesbian magazine in Portugal, 1991–1993?
 Zona Livre – 1997

Romania
 ENOLA – published by Accept, 2006–?

Russia
Pinx – 2006–present

Serbia
 labris: Lezbejske novine – Belgrade, 1994–?
 Novosadska Lezbejska Organizacija Newsletter – Novi Sad

Slovenia
 Lesbo – Ljubljana, Magazine of ŠKUC-LL Group, c. 1988

Spain
 Caladona: Un espai de dones per a dones – Barcelona, Caladona, lesbian magazine in Catalan language, 1993–present
 Laberint: revista de mujeros para mujeros – Barcelona, c. 1992–1994
 Mujeres y Punto – Madrid, newsletter of CRECUL, Comité Reivindicativo Cultural de Lesbianas de Madrid
 Sales: Revista Lesbica – Barcelona, Revista Sales
 Towanda! Revista Lesbica – Zaragoza, 2002–?
 MagLes Magazine – Barcelona, 2012–present

Sweden
 Lesbisk Feministiska – Stockholm, c. 1984–1988
 Lila perspektiv – Stockholm, c. 1981–1984

Switzerland
1970 to 1980
 Lesbenfront – Zurich, 1974–1985

1980–1990
 Frau Ohne Herz – Zurich, 1985–1995
 ELLA: Das Lesbenforum – Basel, 1985–1993?
 ILIS Bulletin – Geneva, International Lesbian Information Service, Clit International, 1984–86

1990–2000
 die –  Lesbenzeitschrift aus der Schweiz, Zurich, 1996–2004
 Ellas ketchup – Basel, 1993–?

2000–present
 Skipper – Zürich, 2004–2005

Unknown year
 CLIT 007 – lesbian feminist magazine

Turkey
 "Öte-ki-ben (From Woman to Woman) – Ankara, Turkey / Frankfurt am Main, Germany, 2001–?

Ukraine
 Лесби Портал – lesbian feminist publication, 2018–present

United Kingdom
Prior to 1970
 Arena Three – London, Minorities Research Group, 1963–1972
 Kenric Newsletter – c. 1960s–present
 Minorities Research Group Newsletter

1970 to 1980
 Lesbians Come Together – London, c. 1972
 Medusa: Journal of the Bradford Lesbian Feminist Surrealist Group – c. 1978–?
 Move – Bristol, c 1970s–?
 Sappho – London, newsletter of the Southwark Lesbian Network; for lesbians only, 1971–?
 Sequel: A Feminist Magazine for Isolated Lesbians – London, c. 1979
 Zero: Anarcha-feminist Newsmagazine – London, 1978–?

1980 to 1990
 Bristol Radical Lesbian Feminist Magazine 1986–1990
 Camden Lesbian Centre Newsletter/ Camden Black Lesbian Group Newsletter – London, available in both print and cassette, 1987–1991
 Lesbian Information Service Newsletter – Leicester, available in both print and cassette, 1987–1989,
 Lesbian International – Leicester, for lesbians only, available in print and cassette, 1989–1990
 Gemma – London; lesbians with and without disabilities, all ages; available in print or on cassette, c.1980
 Gossip: A Journal of Lesbian Feminist Ethics – London, for lesbians only; Onlywomen Press, c. 1986–?
 Lesbian Archive and Information Centre Newsletter – London, Lesbian Archive and Information Centre (LAIC), c. 1985–?
 Quim Magazine: For Dykes of All Sexual Persuasions – London, 1989–1995, plus one issue in 2001
 Spinster: Feminist Creative Work with an Emphasis on the Work of Lesbians – London, 1982–?

After 1990
 The Axe – Bradford lesbian newsletter, 1996–1997
 B.I.D (Behaviour, Identity, Desire) – online monthly magazine (99p subscription), November 2011
 crAve – bi-monthly magazine, 2008–present
 Diva – London, 1994–present
Dykenosis : the newsletter of LesBeWell - Birmingham, 1994–1998
 G3 Magazine – London, free monthly national publication
 Lesbian London – London, also released on cassette tape, 1992–1993
Shebang – London, 1992–?
 Velvet

Year unknown
 Artemis: For Women who Love Women – London, magazine of the Artemis Club
 Lesbian Zone – Manchester
 Lesbians in Education – London
 Lesbians in Libraries – England
 Older Lesbians Network Newsletter – London

Wales / Cymru
 Cardiff Women's Liberation Newsletter – Cardiff, "for wimmin only", c. 1970s–1980s
 Older Lesbian Network Newsletter
 Women Come Together: Swansea Women's Liberation Newsletter – Swansea, c. 1970s
 WomenZone: Connecting lesbians across Wales – Swansea, c. 1990s

Oceania

New Zealand
1970 to 1980
 Circle, later Lesbian Feminist Circle – Wellington, "for lesbians only", collectively produced 1973–1985
 Spiral – literary and arts journal for women, founded in 1976 by Heather McPherson; the press also published Keri Hulme's Booker Prize-winning novel The Bone People in 1984
 Wellington Lesbian Network – Wellington, newsletter; for lesbians only, c. 1979–1999

1980 to 1990
 Bitches, Witches, & Dykes – Auckland, 1980–1981
 Glad Rag – Wellington – for lesbians only, c. 1983
 Lesbians in Print (LIP) – Auckland, for women only, 1985–1991
 Sapphic star – Auckland, c. 1989–1991
 Tamaki Makaurau lesbian newsletter – Auckland, New Zealand, c. 1990–present

After 1990
 The Laughing Medusa – lesbian literary magazine, edited by Kedy Kristal and Takoel Akuni, c. 1991–1993

Australia
1970 to 1980
 A. L. M. Newsletter – Melbourne, newsletter of the Australian Lesbian Movement, c. 1971
 Blatant Lesbianism – Sydney, c. 1978–?
 Patchwork newsletter – Brisbane, c. 1978?

1980 to 1990
 Australian Lesbian Diary – Melbourne, c. 1987
 Sage: the separatist age – Australia, lesbian separatist periodical; title was formerly Seps Down Under; "A cauldron of lesbian separatist thought dreams and visions", c. 1990–1992
 S.E.P.S. Down Under (Newsletter of Separatists Eroding Patriarch Sincerely) – Waucope, c. 1989
 Wicked Women – Australia – 1988–1993

1990 to 2000
 Australian Asian Lesbian News – Sydney, c. 1991
 Banshee – Melbourne, c. 1992
 Dis-Ease – Sydney, c. 1993
 Elam – Newcastle, newsletter of the Hunter Lesbian Group, c. 1998
 Geelong Lesbian Group – Geelong, c. 1999–?
 Hell Bent (Wicked Women Publications) Redfern, Sydney, c. 1991
 Interlesbian – Melbourne, multi-cultural lesbian news, c. 1994
 Journal of Australian Lesbian Feminist Studies – Haymarket, New South Wales, 1991–1995
 Labrys – Melbourne, 1990–1992
 Lesbian Network – Rozelle, Lesbian Network Collective, c. 1990s
 Lesbians on the Loose – now LOTL – Darlinghurst, 1990–present
 Lesbiana – Fitzroy, c. 1992
 Lilac – Launceston, Tasmania, 1993–1996
 olderdykes.org – Sydney, online magazine for lesbians over 40
 Out Loud – Eltham, women's cultural magazine focussing on lesbian and feminist content, c. 1992–?
 ShOut Newsletter – Melbourne, c. 1994
 Suncoast Lesbian Information Press – Queensland, c. 1995–?
 Women Out West – Perth, 1999–present, WOW

2000 to present
 Cherrie – national
 SASS Magazine Melbourne
 velvet Tipt – Melbourne, magazine for lesbians in Victoria and Tasmania, 2005–2006
 Butch is Not a Dirty Word – Melbourne, 2017–present
 Slit magazine, 2002-

Year unknown
 The Bloody Rag – Lismore
 Grapevine – Western Australia
 Lesbian News – National Magazine
 Lesbian Territory – Northern Territory
 Lesbian Times – North Adelaide
 Outloud – Melbourne

South America

Argentina
 Cuaderno de existensia Lesbiana – (CEL) Argentina c. 1987
 Fulanas – Argentina, 2000

Brazil
 Chana com Chana – Sao Paulo, published by the Grupo de Acao Lesbica-Feminista, c.1979–1987
 Femme
 Rede Outro Olhar

Chile
 Amazonas – Chile
 Baruyera – Chile, Colectiva Lésbica Mafalda
 Hilando Destinos – Chile, published by the Colectiva Lésbica feminista Moiras
 Lazos – Chile
 Montedevenus: Mujeres que aman Mujeres – online magazine
 Rompiendo el Silencio

Peru
 otro lado de la luna

North America

Canada

1970 to 1980
 Dyke – Montreal, Quebec, 1977
 Grapevine: Newsletter of the Lesbian Mother's Defence Fund – Toronto, Ontario, c. 1979–1883
 Lesbian Canada Lesbienne – Halifax, Nova Scotia, published by the Atlantic Provinces Political Lesbians for Equality (APPLE), 1977/1978
 Lesbian Feminists of Montreal Newsletter – Montreal, Quebec, published by the Lesbian Feminists of Montreal, 1977
 Lesbian Organization of Toronto (L.O.O.T.) Newsletter – Toronto, Ontario, 1977–1980
 Lesbian Perspective – Toronto, Ontario, published by the Lesbian Organization of Toronto (LOOT), 1979–1980
 Lesbians/lesbiennes – Toronto, Ontario, 1979–1981
 Lesbomonde – Montreal, Quebec 1973–1974
 London Lesbian Collective News – London, Ontario, published by the LCC, 1977–1978
 Long Time Coming – Montreal, Quebec, published by Montreal Gay Women (originally women's committee of Gay McGill University), 1973–1976
 The Other Woman – Toronto, Ontario, feminist and lesbian news magazine, 1972–?
 Pedestal: Lesbian-Feminist Newspaper – Vancouver, B.C., 1975, women's liberation paper, reorganized briefly in 1975 as a lesbian feminist paper
 Sisters Lightship – Halifax, Nova Scotia, 1978
 Three of Cups – Toronto, Ontario, 1976–1978
 Wages Due Lesbians – Toronto, Ontario, c. 1977–78
 Waves: a Lesbian Feminist Newsletter – Victoria, BC, 1978–1979

1980 to 1990
 Amazones d'Hier, Lesbiennes d'Aujourd'hui – Montreal, Quebec, for lesbians only, 1982
 Association of Women's Music and Culture – Toronto, published by Womynly Way Productions, c. 1989
 Ca s'attrape – Montreal, Quebec, 1982
 Communique'Elles – 1980s
 Diversity, the Lesbian Rag – Vancouver, B.C., published by the Diversity Collective 1988–1991,
 Flagrant – Vancouver, B.C., 1981–1984
 Furie Lesbienne / Lesbian Fury – Ottawa, Ontario, for lesbians only, c. 1985–1995
 KINESIS: news about women that's not in the dailies – Vancouver, British Columbia, published by the Vancouver Status of Women, a non-sectarian feminist voice covering some lesbian issues, c. 1980s/1990s
 Lavender Sheets – Toronto, Ontario, published by the Lesbian Organization of Toronto (LOOT), c. 1980
 Lavender Times – Calgary, Alberta, project of the Calgary Womyn's Collective, 1987–?
 Lesbian Newsletter – Regina, SK, c. 1985
 LesbiaNews/LNews – Victoria, BC,1989–98
 The Open Door: Rural Lesbian Newsletter – Burns Lake/Terrace, British Columbia/Nelson, B.C., 1983–1986
 The Radical Reviewer – Vancouver, B.C., Lesbian Literary Collective magazine, 1980–1983
 Treize! Revue Lesbienne – Montreal, Quebec, 1984–present
 Web of Crones – Vancouver, BC, 1986
 Womonspace News: Our Voice in the Lesbian Community – Edmonton, Alberta,  1983–?
 Zami Newsletter – Toronto, Ontario, c. 1987–88

1990 to 2000
 Au-dela de l'invisibilite: le bulletin de la Collective Lesbienne – Ottawa, Ontario, published by the Collective Lesbienne, c. 1998
 Chicklist: Proudly Peddling Chick Power, Pleasure and Polemic – Toronto, published by the Pink Triangle Press, c. 1997
 Gazelle: le magazine des lesbiennes – Montreal, Quebec, 1992–?
 Limbo: Lesbian Bi-Monthly Magazine – London, Ontario, published by Limbo, 1999
 SamiYoni: a ioumal for lesbians of South Asian Descent – Toronto, 1993–1994
 Sensible Shoes News: The Newsletter of Saskatchewan's Lesbian Communities – Regina, mid-1990s
 Siren – Toronto, Ontario, "Irresistibly tempting, for lesbians", 1995–2004
 Voices for Lesbian Survival: By and For Lesbians – Kenora, Ontario, published by the Voices Collective, c. 1995

After 2000
 No More Potlucks – Montreal, Quebec, ?–present (bilingual French/English online magazine)
 QueeriesMag.com – Toronto, Ontario, 2010–present (online lifestyle magazine)

Mexico
 Amantes de la Luna – CIDHOM – Mexico City, 1994–?
 Amazona – Mexico, published by Colectivo de Lesbianas del F H A R, (Frente Homosexual de Accion Revolucionaria), c.1979 (Coordinadora Lesbica)
Del otro lado – magazine of Grupo de Madres Lesbianas 2, c. 1996
 HIMEN Fanzine – Mexico City, published by Colectiva HIMEN
 Les Voz, Mexico's lesbian feminist magazine- Mexico, 1994–present

United States

See also

Lesbian

 Lesbian feminism
 Lesbian fiction
 Lesbian organizations
 Lesbian separatism

LGBT
 List of LGBT periodicals
 List of LGBT-related organizations

References

Sources

Books

Articles
Whitt, Jan. A "Labor from the Heart": Lesbian Magazines from 1947–1994, Journal of Lesbian Studies, vol5, Issue 1/2, Haworth Press, 2001

Footnotes

External links

Archival collections

Guide to the Joan Ariel Collection of Lesbian Periodicals. Special Collections and Archives, The UC Irvine Libraries, Irvine, California.

Other

Europe

Archif Menywod Cymru / Women's Archive of Wales
Archives Recherches Cultures Lesbiennes ARCL
Conservatoire des Archives et des Mémoires LGBT
Coordination Lesbienne en France
Portuguese Lesbian History
Separatist Lesbian Cultural Association Visibilia Italy
Spanish LGBT Groups
Spinnboden Lesbenarchiv

North America

Activist Latina Lesbian Publishing – by tatiana de la tierra
Canadian Gay and Lesbian periodicals // Periodiques Canadiens pour les Gais et Les Lesbiennes
CatalogQ Periodicals
Finding aid for the Feminist and Lesbian Periodical Collection, Special Collections and University Archives, University of Oregon
History of Women's Media, Martha Allen- Women's Institute for Freedom of the Press
Human Sexuality Collection, Cornell University
June L. Mazer Lesbian Archives – Los Angeles
Lesbian and Gay Liberation in Canada: A Selected, Annotated Chronology 1964–1975, Donald W. McLeod
Lesbian (Feminist) Los Angeles, 1970–1990: An Exploratory Ethnohistory, Yolanda Retter University of New Mexico
McCormick Library of Special Collections, Northwestern University Library

Oceania

Australian Lesbian and Gay Archives
Australian Lesbian and Gay Archives Periodical Index
Lesbian and Gay Archives of New Zealand

LGBT
LGBT publications
Periodicals
 
Lesbian periodicals
Periodicals